Garden of Expression is a studio album by American jazz saxophonist Joe Lovano released on  by ECM Records. The album was recorded in November 2019 together with pianist Marilyn Crispell and percussionist Carmen Castaldi in Lugano, Switzerland.

Background
This is the second album of the trio. The release contains eight original jazz compositions written by Lovano. He explains the music on the album, "Each of the pieces is a song of expression where rhythm doesn’t dictate the flow. This is not a band that starts from the beat. The momentum is in the melody and the harmonic sequence. And rhythm evolves within each piece in a very free flowing manner."

Reception
Michael Ullman writing for The Arts Fuse stated, "It’s a remarkable group achievement, an intelligently meditative series of pieces that demonstrate not so much the individual instrumental virtuosity of the musicians as their virtuosity as listeners and as suggestive, supportive partners. I’ll call it a series of meditations." Steve Futterman of The New Yorker wrote, "As his many admirers will attest, the saxophonist Joe Lovano can turn on the juice, blowing hard and strong, whenever necessary. His credentials as a full-blooded jazz swinger and an unfettered free improviser are perfectly in order. His most satisfying work, though, may be on display when he cools his jets and allows his gentle side to come to the fore." Mike Hobart of Financial Times noted, "Although saxophone is the dominant voice, the collective spirit is high. Crispell closely follows Lovano’s trains of thought with a wide array of voicings and melodic fragments of her own invention and holds one’s attention when taking the lead. With no steady bass, Castaldi can tug the pulse this way and that, decorate phrases and rumble and roar when required." John Fordham of The Guardian added, " Garden of Expression is about the spaces between sounds as much as sounds themselves – but, as in meditation, they’re spaces that resonate with stories." Morning Star's review called the album "exemplary, full of spacious and reflective instrumental jazz."

Track listing

Personnel
Joe Lovano – gong, tenor and soprano saxophone, tarogato
Carmen Castaldi – drums, percussion
Marilyn Crispell – piano

References

2021 albums
ECM Records albums
Joe Lovano albums
Albums produced by Manfred Eicher